The Temple of Hera Lacinia, or Juno Lacinia, otherwise known as Temple D, is a Greek temple in the Valle dei Templi, a section of the ancient city of Agrigentum (ancient Greek Akragas, modern Agrigento) in Sicily.

It was built in the middle of the fifth century BC, about the year 450 BC, and in period and in style belongs to the Archaic Doric period.  Signs of a fire which followed the Siege of Akragas of 406 BC have been detected, and long after that the temple was restored at the time of the Roman province of Sicily, with the original terracotta roof being replaced by one of marble, with a more steeply inclined slope on the eastern side. The temple was originally dedicated to the Greek god Hera, Roman Juno. If still in use by the 4th-and 5th century, it would have been closed during the persecution of pagans in the late Roman Empire.

Description
The building is a peripterotic Doric temple, with six columns on the short sides (hexastyle) and thirteen on the long sides, according to a canon derived from the models of the Greek homeland and also used for its "twin", the Temple of Concordia, with which it shares general dimensions, as if some elements of the buildings had been standardised. The temple's floor plan is around 38.15 metres long by 16.90 metres wide.

The front columns differ slightly in width, tapering at the ends and swelling at their middles. The peristyle of thirty-four 6.44 metre-high columns, each formed from four stacked drums,  rests on a crepidoma of four steps. The whole edifice is on a raised spur, which is in large part artificial. In front of the eastern face are notable remains of the ancient altar.

The interior is composed of a cella, with no internal colonnade, of the double antis type, with its pronaos at the front mirrored by the opisthodomos at the back – both framed by two ranks of columns (distyle).  Two stairs for the inspection of the roof, or perhaps for religious purposes, were built into the wall separating the naos from the pronaos.

The northern colonnade with the architrave and part of the frieze is completely preserved, while the colonnades on the other three sides are only partly surviving, with four columns missing and nine severely damaged, and they almost entirely lack their architraves. Some small elements of the naos remain, mostly the foundations of its exterior walls. The building has been being restored using anastylosis since the eighteenth century.

External links

450 BC
Hera
Buildings and structures in the Province of Agrigento
Valle dei Templi
450s BC
5th-century BC establishments in Italy
Temples of Hera
5th-century BC religious buildings and structures
Archaeological sites in Sicily